The 2001 SEAT Open was a women's tennis tournament played on indoor hard courts in Kockelscheuer, Luxembourg which was part of Tier III of the 2001 WTA Tour. It was the 6th edition of the tournament and was held from 22 October until 28 October 2001. First-seeded Kim Clijsters won the singles title, her second at the event after 1999, and earned $27,000 first-prize money.

Finals

Singles

 Kim Clijsters defeated  Lisa Raymond, 6–2, 6–2
 This was Clijsters' 3rd singles title of the year and the 6th of her career.

Doubles

 Elena Bovina /  Daniela Hantuchová defeated  Bianka Lamade /  Patty Schnyder, 6–3, 6–3

References

External links
 ITF tournament edition details
 Tournament draws

SEAT Luxembourg Open
Luxembourg Open
2001 in Luxembourgian tennis